Nairoviridae is a family of viruses in the order Bunyavirales. Its name derives from Nairobi sheep disease, caused by the member Nairobi sheep disease orthonairovirus.

Taxonomy 
The family contains the following genera:

Norwavirus
Ocetevirus
Orthonairovirus
Sabavirus
Shaspivirus
Striwavirus
Xinspivirus

References

External links

 ICTV Report: Nairoviridae

 
Virus families